Həmyə or Gam’ya may refer to:
Balaca Həmyə, Azerbaijan
Böyük Həmyə, Azerbaijan